Melinophagi or Melinophagoi is the name of a Thracian tribe.

References

See also
Thracian tribes

Ancient tribes in Thrace
Thracian tribes